Corley Ellis is an American politician who has served as a Republican member of the Alabama House of Representatives since first winning election in 2016.

In 1993, Ellis earned a BS degree in business administration from Auburn University. In 1995, he earned an MBA degree, also from Auburn. Ellis is the owner of Ellis Property Inc, a real estate brokerage firm.

Ellis' political career began when he served as Shelby County Commissioner for District 1.

On October 18, 2016, Ellis won the special election in District 41 in the Alabama House of Representatives. Ellis replaced Mike Hill. On November 6, 2018, Ellis won re-election and remained a member of the Alabama House of Representatives.

Ellis' wife is Julie Harris Ellis. They have a son. Ellis resides in Shelby County, Alabama.

References

External links 
 Biography at Shelby County Legislative Delegation Office
 Corley Ellis at votesmart.org

Living people
Republican Party members of the Alabama House of Representatives
Year of birth missing (living people)
Auburn University alumni
People from Shelby County, Alabama
21st-century American politicians